Cadmium fluoride (CdF2) is a mostly water-insoluble source of cadmium used in oxygen-sensitive applications, such as the production of metallic alloys. In extremely low concentrations (ppm), this and other fluoride compounds are used in limited medical treatment protocols. Fluoride compounds also have significant uses in synthetic organic chemistry. The standard enthalpy has been found to be -167.39 kcal. mole−1 and the Gibbs energy of formation has been found to be -155.4 kcal. mole−1, and the heat of sublimation was determined to be 76 kcal. mole−1.

Preparation
Cadmium fluoride is prepared by the reaction of gaseous fluorine or hydrogen fluoride with cadmium metal or its salts, such as the chloride, oxide, or sulfate.

It may also be obtained by dissolving cadmium carbonate in 40% hydrofluoric acid solution, evaporating the solution and drying in a vacuum at 150 °C.

Another method of preparing it is to mix cadmium chloride and ammonium fluoride solutions, followed by crystallization. The insoluble cadmium fluoride is filtered from solution.

Cadmium fluoride has also been prepared by reacting fluorine with cadmium sulfide. This reaction happens very quickly and forms nearly pure fluoride at much lower temperatures than other reactions used.

Uses

Electronic conductor 

CdF2 can be transformed into an electronic conductor when doped with certain rare earth elements or yttrium and treated with cadmium vapor under high temperature conditions. This process creates blue crystals with varying absorption coefficients depending on the concentrations of the dopant. A proposed mechanism explains that the conductivity of these crystals can be explained by a reaction of Cd atoms with Interstitial F− ions. This creates more CdF2 molecules and releases electrons which are weakly bonded to trivalent dopant ions resulting in n-type conductivity and a hydrogenic donor level.

Safety
Cadmium fluoride, like all cadmium compounds, is toxic and should be used with care.

Cadmium fluoride can cause potential health issues if it is not handled properly. It can cause irritation to the skin and the eyes, so gloves and protective eyewear are advised. The MSDS, or Material Safety Data Sheet, also includes warnings for ingestion and inhalation. Under acidic conditions, at high temperatures, and in moist environments, hydrogen fluoride and cadmium vapors may be released into the air. Inhalation may cause irritation of the respiratory system as well as congestion, fluorosis, and even pulmonary edema in extreme cases. Cadmium fluoride also has the same potential hazards caused by cadmium and fluoride.

References

External links
 National Pollutant Inventory - Cadmium and compounds fact sheet
 National Pollutant Inventory - Fluoride and compounds fact sheet

Fluorides
Metal halides
Cadmium compounds
Fluorite crystal structure